Myrsinoideae is a subfamily of the family Primulaceae in the order Ericales. It was formerly recognized as the family Myrsinaceae, or the myrsine family,  consisting of 35 genera and about 1000 species. It is widespread in temperate to tropical climates extending north to Europe, Siberia, Japan, Mexico, and Florida, and south to New Zealand, South America, and South Africa.

Plants are mostly mesophytic trees and shrubs; a few are lianas or subherbaceous. Their leathery, evergreen leaves are simple and alternate, with smooth margins and without stipules. They are often dotted with glands and resinous cavities. The latter may take the form of secretory lines.

The plants are mostly monoecious, but a few are dioecious. The flowers have four or five sepals and petals. The floral envelope (perianth) has a distinct calyx and corolla. The calyx is regular and polysepalous. The nonfleshy petals of the corolla are more or less united, closely overlapping. The four or five stamens are usually isomerous with the perianth. The carpel has one style and one stigma, with the ovary unilocular, superior or semi-inferior.

The one-seeded, indehiscent fruit is a thin-fleshed berry or drupe.
North American species are the marlberry (Ardisia escalloniodes) and the Florida rapanea (Rapanea punctata).

Plants in the subfamily have few economic uses. A few genera, such as Ardisia, Cyclamen, Lysimachia, and Myrsine, are grown as ornamental plants, especially Ardisia crispa and Myrsine africana. One species, Ardisia japonica (Chinese: 紫金牛; pinyin: zǐjīn niú), is one of the 50 fundamental herbs in traditional Chinese medicine.

In the APG III system and onwards, the Myrsinaceae were not recognized, but were sunk into Primulaceae, which in that system is circumscribed very broadly.

Genera
 Aegiceras
 Amblyanthopsis
 Amblyanthus
 Anagallis
 Antistrophe
 Ardisia
 Asterolinon (should be included into the Anagallis clade)
 Badula
 Conandrium
 Coris
 Ctenardisia
 Cybianthus
 Cyclamen
 Discocalyx
 Elingamita
 Embelia
 Emblemantha
 Fittingia
 Geissanthus
 Glaux (should be included into the clade Lysimachia)
 Heberdenia
 Hymenandra
 Labisia
 Loheria
 Lysimachia
 Maesa
 Monoporus
 Myrsine
 Oncostemum
 Parathesis
 Pelletiera (should be included into the Anagallis clade)
 Pleiomeris
 Rapanea
 Sadiria
 Solonia
 Stylogyne
 Tapeinosperma
 Trientalis
 Tetrardisia
 Vegaea
 Wallenia

The following genera, traditionally categorized in Primulaceae sensu lato, should, according to Källersjö et al. (2000), belong to the Myrsinoideae (the clade of Myrsinaceae s. l.): Anagallis, Ardisiandra, Asterolinon, Coris, Cyclamen, Glaux, Lysimachia, Pelletiera  and Trientalis.

References

 
 
 

Plant subfamilies
Primulaceae